The 8.8 cm Raketenwerfer 43 Puppchen was an 88 mm calibre reusable anti-tank rocket launcher developed by Nazi Germany during World War II.

Raketenwerfer 43 was given to infantry to bolster their anti-tank capability. The weapon was fired from a small two-wheeled gun carriage which fired a percussion-primed, rocket-propelled, fin-stabilized grenade  RPzB. Gr. 4312 with a shaped charge warhead. The grenade had a shorter tailboom of  compared to the  tailboom for the electrically-primed grenade RPzB. Gr. 4322 for the Panzerschreck. Both grenades used identical warhead and fuzing.

Approximately 3,000 units were completed from 1943 to 1945. It was made in much smaller numbers than either the Panzerschreck, which was based on the American Bazooka rocket launcher, or the Panzerfaust, which was a disposable anti tank recoilless rifle. This is partly because it was realized that a simple hollow tube with an ignition device was all that was needed to launch the 88 mm rocket, rather than an elaborate miniature artillery piece with carriage and breech. Due to the carriage and better sights, the accuracy was better, and the range more than double that of the Panzerschreck. However, Raketenwerfer 43 was more expensive, heavier and had longer production time than Panzerschreck or  Panzerfaust.

See also
Shoulder-launched missile weapon
List of common World War II infantry weapons

References

Notes

External links

 http://www.lonesentry.com/articles/rocket/index.html
 

Anti-tank rockets
World War II infantry weapons of Germany
Weapons and ammunition introduced in 1943